Bracken County is a county located in the U.S. state of Kentucky. As of the 2020 census, the population was 8,400. Its county seat is Brooksville. The county was formed in 1796.
Bracken County is included in the Cincinnati-Middletown, OH-KY-IN Metropolitan Statistical Area.

History
Bracken County was organized as Kentucky's 23rd county in 1796 from parts of Mason and Campbell counties. It was named after two creeks, the Big and Little Bracken, which in turn were named for Matthew Bracken, an 18th-century explorer and surveyor who visited the area in 1773. He was later killed by Indians during the Northwest Indian War. The county originally extended to southern Nicholas County, north to the Ohio River, west to the Licking River and east to Dover, Kentucky.

Several early settlers were veterans of the American Revolutionary War, including Captain Abner Howell, who brought his family came from Pennsylvania. He died in Bracken County in 1797.

The county government moved from Augusta to Woodward's Crossing (now Brooksville) in 1833.

Bracken was the birthplace of John Gregg Fee, founder of Berea College and Kentucky's most noted abolitionist. He was a graduate of Augusta College and Lane Theological Seminary. In 1822 Augusta College was founded as the first Methodist college in the world.

Anti-slavery activists in Bracken County played a major role in the movement known as the Underground Railroad. There are several Underground Railroad sites in the Augusta area. A network of citizens sympathetic to escaping slaves helped them cross the Ohio River to nearby Ripley, Ohio and other points north.

Bracken County's economy was largely agricultural. Its chief crops before the Civil War were tobacco and corn. White burley tobacco, a light, adaptable leaf that revolutionized the industry, was first sold at the 1867 St. Louis Fair by the farmer Mr. Webb from Higginsport, Ohio. He had produced it in 1864 from Bracken County seed and developed the type. It became a major product of central Kentucky and central Tennessee.

Agriculture remains vital to the economy, with farms occupying 83.8 percent of the land area in 1982. Commodities include wheat, hay, and milk. Burley tobacco production in 1988 amounted to 5,406,000 pounds. Agricultural receipts in 1986 totaled $19,158,000.

Historic schools
Augusta:
 Bracken Academy
 Augusta Methodist College

Brooksville:
 Saint James Elementary and High School

Germantown:
 Germantown College

Milford:
 Milford Graded and High School

Law and government
Judge Executives
 Earl Bush (2011–Present)
 Gary Riggs (2007–2011)
 Leslie Newman (2002–2007)
 Dwayne "Pie" Jett (1987–2002)

Geography

Adjacent counties
 Clermont County, Ohio  (north – across the Ohio River)
 Brown County, Ohio  (northeast – across the Ohio River)
 Mason County  (east)
 Robertson County  (south)
 Harrison County  (southwest)
 Pendleton County  (west)

Demographics

As of the census of 2000, there were 8,279 people, 3,228 households, and 2,346 families residing in the county. The racial makeup of the county was 98.48% White, 0.62% Black or African American, 0.25% Native American, 0.06% Asian, 0.04% Pacific Islander, 0.21% from other races, and 0.35% from two or more races.  0.47% of the population were Hispanic or Latino of any race.

There were 3,228 households, out of which 33.50% had children under the age of 18 living with them, 57.30% were married couples living together, 10.70% had a female householder with no husband present, and 27.30% were non-families. 23.90% of all households were made up of individuals, and 11.30% had someone living alone who was 65 years of age or older.  The average household size was 2.55 and the average family size was 3.00.

In the county, the population was spread out, with 25.50% under the age of 18, 8.40% from 18 to 24, 29.50% from 25 to 44, 23.00% from 45 to 64, and 13.50% who were 65 years of age or older.  The median age was 37 years. For every 100 females, there were 98.00 males.  For every 100 females age 18 and over, there were 95.90 males.

The median income for a household in the county was $34,823, and the median income for a family was $40,469. Males had a median income of $31,503 versus $21,139 for females. The per capita income for the county was $16,478.  About 7.60% of families and 10.80% of the population were below the poverty line, including 10.50% of those under age 18 and 17.30% of those age 65 or over.

Education
School districts include:
 Augusta Independent Schools in Augusta
 Bracken County Schools in Brooksville

Private schools:
 Saint Augustine Elementary School in Augusta

Communities
 Augusta
 Brooksville (county seat)
 Foster
 Germantown

Notable residents
 Nick Clooney, a Cincinnati journalist and former newsanchor, and his wife Nina live in Augusta.
 George Clooney, their son and an actor, grew up in Augusta and went to high school there.
 Heather French Henry, Miss America 2000, grew up in Augusta and still lives there.  Heather and her husband, former Ky. Lt. Governor Steve Henry, are the curators of the Rosemary Clooney Museum in Augusta.
 Rosemary Clooney, singer and actress, lived in Augusta. Her most notable film was White Christmas.
 John G. Fee, Minister and Educator, Born in Bracken Co. Founder Berea College.

See also

 National Register of Historic Places listings in Bracken County, Kentucky

References

External links
 Historical Images and Texts of Bracken County, Kentucky

 
1796 establishments in Kentucky
Kentucky counties
Kentucky counties on the Ohio River
Populated places on the Underground Railroad
Populated places established in 1796